Fisherville is the name of several places in the U.S. state of Pennsylvania, including:

Fisherville, Blair County, Pennsylvania
Fisherville, Dauphin County, Pennsylvania